The 1888–89 season was Derby County's first season in the Football League which had just been founded. Because of this they became one of the founder members of the Football League. They finished in 10th position with 16 points.

Final league table

Key: P = Matches played; W = Matches won; D = Matches drawn; L = Matches lost; F = Goals for; A = Goals against; GA = Goal average; Pts = Points

Results

Derby County's score comes first

Legend

Football League

FA Cup

Appearances

See also
1888–89 in English football
List of Derby County F.C. seasons

References

Derby County F.C. seasons
Derby